Ambridge was a South Shore Line flag stop located at Bridge Street in the Ambridge Mann neighborhood of Gary, Indiana. The station opened in 1920, and closed on July 5, 1994, as part of an NICTD service revision which also saw the closure of Kemil Road, Willard Avenue, LaLumiere, Rolling Prairie, and New Carlisle.

References

Former South Shore Line stations
Former railway stations in Indiana
Transportation in Gary, Indiana
Railway stations in the United States opened in 1920
Railway stations closed in 1994
Railway stations in Lake County, Indiana
1920 establishments in Indiana
1994 disestablishments in Indiana
Demolished railway stations in the United States